The Russo-Turkish War of 1877–1878 (named for the year 1293 in the Islamic calendar; , "Russian–Turkish war") was a conflict between the Ottoman Empire and a coalition led by the Russian Empire, and including Bulgaria, Romania, Serbia, and Montenegro. Fought in the Balkans and in the Caucasus, it originated in emerging 19th century Balkan nationalism. Additional factors included the Russian goals of recovering territorial losses endured during the Crimean War of 1853–56, re-establishing itself in the Black Sea and supporting the political movement attempting to free Balkan nations from the Ottoman Empire.

The Russian-led coalition won the war, pushing the Ottomans back all the way to the gates of Constantinople, leading to the intervention of the western European great powers. As a result, Russia succeeded in claiming provinces in the Caucasus, namely Kars and Batum, and also annexed the Budjak region. The principalities of Romania, Serbia, and Montenegro, each of which had had de facto sovereignty for some years, formally proclaimed independence from the Ottoman Empire. After almost five centuries of Ottoman domination (1396–1878), the Principality of Bulgaria emerged as an autonomous Bulgarian state with support and military intervention from Russia.

Conflict pre-history

Treatment of Christians in the Ottoman Empire 
Article 9 of the 1856 Paris Peace Treaty, concluded at the end of the Crimean War, obliged the Ottoman Empire to grant Christians equal rights with Muslims. Before the treaty was signed, the Ottoman government issued an edict, the Edict of Gülhane, which proclaimed the principle of the equality of Muslims and non-Muslims, and produced some specific reforms to this end. For example, the jizya tax was abolished and non-Muslims were allowed to join the army.

Crisis in Lebanon, 1860

In 1858, stirred by their clergy, the Maronite peasants of northern Lebanon revolted against their predominantly Druze feudal overlords and established a peasant republic. In southern Lebanon, where both Maronite and Druze peasants worked under Druze overlords, Druze peasants sided with their co-religious and against the Maronites, transforming the conflict into a civil war. Although both sides suffered, about 10,000 Maronites were massacred at the hands of the Druze.

On 27 May 1860, a group of Maronites raided a Druze village. Massacres and reprisal massacres followed, not only in Lebanon but also in Syria. In the end, between 7,000 and 12,000 people of all religions had been killed, and over 300 villages, 500 churches, 40 monasteries, and 30 schools were destroyed. Christian attacks on Muslims in Beirut stirred the Muslim population of Damascus to attack the Christian minority with between 5,000 and 25,000 of the latter being killed, including the American and Dutch consuls, giving the event an international dimension.

Fearing European intervention, the Ottoman foreign minister Mehmed Fuad Pasha was dispatched to Syria and immediately set about trying to resolve the conflict as swiftly as possible. Mehmed sought out and executed the agitators on all sides, including the governor and other officials. Order was soon restored, and preparations made to give Lebanon new autonomy. These efforts were ultimately not enough to prevent European intervention, however, with France deploying a fleet in September 1860. Fearing that a unilateral intervention would increase French influence in the region at their expense, the British joined the French expedition. Faced with further European pressure, the Sultan agreed to appoint a Christian governor in Lebanon, whose candidacy was to be submitted by the Sultan and approved by the European powers.

The revolt in Crete, 1866–1869

The Cretan Revolt, which began in 1866, resulted from the failure of the Ottoman Empire to apply reforms for improving the life of the population and the Cretans' desire for enosis — union with Greece. The insurgents gained control over the whole island, except for five fortified cities where the Muslims took refuge. The Greek press claimed that Muslims had massacred Greeks and the word was spread throughout Europe. Thousands of Greek volunteers were mobilized and sent to the island.

The siege of Arkadi Monastery became particularly well known. In November 1866, about 250 Cretan Greek combatants and around 600 women and children were besieged by about 23,000 mainly Cretan Muslims aided by Ottoman troops, and this became widely known in Europe. After a bloody battle with a large number of casualties on both sides, the Cretan Greeks finally surrendered when their ammunition ran out but were killed upon surrender.

By early 1869, the insurrection was suppressed, but the Porte offered some concessions, introducing island self-rule and increasing Christian rights on the island. Although the Cretan crisis ended better for the Ottomans than almost any other diplomatic confrontation of the century, the insurrection, and especially the brutality with which it was suppressed, led to greater public attention in Europe to the oppression of Christians in the Ottoman Empire.

Changing balance of power in Europe

Although on the winning side in the Crimean War, the Ottoman Empire continued to decline in power and prestige. The financial strain on the treasury forced the Ottoman government to take a series of foreign loans at such steep interest rates that, despite all the fiscal reforms that followed, pushed it into unpayable debts and economic difficulties. This was further aggravated by the need to accommodate more than 600,000 Muslim Circassians, expelled by the Russians from the Caucasus, to the Black Sea ports of north Anatolia and the Balkan ports of Constanța and Varna, which cost a great deal in money and in civil disorder to the Ottoman authorities.

The New European Concert
The Concert of Europe established in 1814 was shaken in 1859 when France and Austria fought over Italy. It came apart completely as a result of the wars of German Unification, when the Kingdom of Prussia, led by Chancellor Otto von Bismarck, defeated Austria in 1866 and France in 1870, replacing Austria-Hungary as the dominant power in Central Europe. Britain, diverted by the Irish question and averse to warfare, chose not to intervene again to restore the European balance. Bismarck did not wish the breakup of the Ottoman Empire to create rivalries that might lead to war, so he took up the Tsar's earlier suggestion that arrangements be made in case the Ottoman Empire fell apart, creating the Three Emperors' League with Austria and Russia to keep France isolated on the continent.

France responded by supporting self-determination movements, particularly if they concerned the three emperors and the Sultan. Thus revolts in Poland against Russia and national aspirations in the Balkans were encouraged by France. Russia worked to regain its right to maintain a fleet on the Black Sea and vied with the French in gaining influence in the Balkans by using the new Pan-Slavic idea that all Slavs should be united under Russian leadership. This could be done only by destroying the two empires where most non-Russian Slavs lived, the Habsburg and the Ottoman Empires. The ambitions and the rivalries of the Russians and French in the Balkans surfaced in Serbia, which was experiencing its own national revival and had ambitions that partly conflicted with those of the great powers.

Russia after the Crimean War

Russia ended the Crimean War with minimal territorial losses, but was forced to destroy its Black Sea Fleet and Sevastopol fortifications. Russian international prestige was damaged, and for many years revenge for the Crimean War became the main goal of Russian foreign policy. This was not easy though – the Paris Peace Treaty included guarantees of Ottoman territorial integrity by Great Britain, France and Austria; only Prussia remained friendly to Russia.

The newly appointed Russian chancellor, Alexander Gorchakov depended upon alliance with Prussia and its chancellor Bismarck. Russia consistently supported Prussia in her wars with Denmark (1864), Austria (1866) and France (1870). In March 1871, using the crushing French defeat and the support of a grateful Germany, Russia achieved international recognition of its earlier denouncement of Article 11 of the Paris Peace Treaty, thus enabling it to revive the Black Sea Fleet.

Other clauses of the Paris Peace Treaty, however, remained in force, specifically Article 8 with guarantees of Ottoman territorial integrity by Great Britain, France and Austria. Therefore, Russia was extremely cautious in its relations with the Ottoman Empire, coordinating all its actions with other European powers. A Russian war with Turkey would require at least the tacit support of all other Great Powers, and Russian diplomacy was waiting for a convenient moment.

Balkan crisis of 1875–1876
In 1875 a series of Balkan events brought Europe to the brink of war. The state of Ottoman administration in the Balkans continued to deteriorate throughout the 19th century, with the central government occasionally losing control over whole provinces. Reforms imposed by European powers did little to improve the conditions of the Christian population, while managing to dissatisfy a sizable portion of the Muslim population. Bosnia and Herzegovina suffered at least two waves of rebellion by the local Muslim population, the most recent in 1850.  Austria consolidated after the turmoil of the first half of the century and sought to reinvigorate its centuries long policy of expansion at the expense of the Ottoman Empire. Meanwhile, the nominally autonomous, de facto independent principalities of Serbia and Montenegro also sought to expand into regions inhabited by their compatriots. Nationalist and irredentist sentiments were strong and were encouraged by Russia and her agents. At the same time, a severe drought in Anatolia in 1873 and flooding in 1874 caused famine and widespread discontent in the heart of the Empire. The agricultural shortages precluded the collection of necessary taxes, which forced the Ottoman government to declare bankruptcy in October 1875 and increase taxes on outlying provinces including the Balkans.

Balkan uprisings

Albanian revolts
István Deák states that the Albanian highlanders resented new taxes and conscription, and fought against the Ottomans in the war.

Herzegovina Uprising

An uprising against Ottoman rule began in Herzegovina in July 1875. By August almost all of Herzegovina had been seized and the revolt had spread into Bosnia. Supported by nationalist volunteers from Serbia and Montenegro, the uprising continued as the Ottomans committed more and more troops to suppress it.

Bulgarian Uprising

The revolt of Bosnia and Herzegovina spurred Bucharest-based Bulgarian revolutionaries into action. In 1875, a Bulgarian uprising was hastily prepared to take advantage of Ottoman preoccupation, but it fizzled before it started. In the spring of 1876, another uprising erupted in the south-central Bulgarian lands despite the fact that there were numerous regular Turkish troops in those areas.

A special Turkish military committee was established to quell the uprising. Regular troops (Nisam) and irregulars (Redif or Bashi-bazouk) were directed to fight the Bulgarians (11 May – 9 June 1876). The irregulars were mostly drawn from the Muslim inhabitants of the Bulgarian region. Many were Circassians from the Caucasus or Crimean Tatars who were expelled during the Crimean War; some were Islamized Bulgarians. The Turkish army suppressed the revolt, massacring up to 30,000 people in the process. Five thousand out of the seven thousand villagers of Batak were put to death. Both Batak and Perushtitsa, where the majority of the population was also massacred, participated in the rebellion. Many of the perpetrators of those massacres were later decorated by the Ottoman high command. Modern historians have estimated the number of murdered Bulgarians at between 30,000 and 100,000.

International reaction to atrocities in Bulgaria
Word of the bashi-bazouks' atrocities filtered to the outside world by way of the American-run Robert College located in Constantinople. The majority of the students were Bulgarian, and many received news of the events from their families back home. Soon the Western diplomatic community in Constantinople was abuzz with rumours, which eventually found their way into newspapers in the West. While in Constantinople in 1879, Protestant missionary George Warren Wood reported Turkish authorities in Amasia brutally persecuting Christian Armenian refugees from Soukoum Kaleh. He was able to coordinate with British diplomat Edward Malet to bring the matter to the attention of the Sublime Porte, and then to the British foreign secretary Robert Gascoyne-Cecil (the Marquess of Salisbury). In Britain, where Disraeli's government was committed to supporting the Ottomans in the ongoing Balkan crisis, the Liberal opposition newspaper Daily News hired American journalist Januarius A. MacGahan to report on the massacre stories firsthand.

MacGahan toured the stricken regions of the Bulgarian uprising, and his report, splashed across the Daily Newss front pages, galvanized British public opinion against Disraeli's pro-Ottoman policy. In September, opposition leader William Gladstone published his Bulgarian Horrors and the Question of the East calling upon Britain to withdraw its support for Turkey and proposing that Europe demand independence for Bulgaria and Bosnia and Herzegovina. As the details became known across Europe, many dignitaries, including Charles Darwin, Oscar Wilde, Victor Hugo and Giuseppe Garibaldi, publicly condemned the Ottoman abuses in Bulgaria.

The strongest reaction came from Russia. Widespread sympathy for the Bulgarian cause led to a nationwide surge in patriotism on a scale comparable with the one during the Patriotic War of 1812. From autumn 1875, the movement to support the Bulgarian uprising involved all classes of Russian society. This was accompanied by sharp public discussions about Russian goals in this conflict: Slavophiles, including Dostoevsky, saw in the impending war the chance to unite all Orthodox nations under Russia's helm, thus fulfilling what they believed was the historic mission of Russia, while their opponents, westernizers, inspired by Turgenev, denied the importance of religion and believed that Russian goals should not be defense of Orthodoxy but liberation of Bulgaria.

Serbo-Turkish War and diplomatic maneuvering

On 30 June 1876, Serbia, followed by Montenegro, declared war on the Ottoman Empire. In July and August, the ill-prepared and poorly equipped Serbian army helped by Russian volunteers failed to achieve offensive objectives but did manage to repulse the Ottoman offensive into Serbia. Meanwhile, Russia's Alexander II and Prince Gorchakov met Austria-Hungary's Franz Joseph I and Count Andrássy in the Reichstadt castle in Bohemia. No written agreement was made, but during the discussions, Russia agreed to support Austrian occupation of Bosnia and Herzegovina, and Austria-Hungary, in exchange, agreed to support the return of Southern Bessarabia—lost by Russia during the Crimean War—and Russian annexation of the port of Batum on the east coast of the Black Sea. Bulgaria was to become autonomous (independent, according to the Russian records).

As the fighting in Bosnia and Herzegovina continued, Serbia suffered a string of setbacks and asked the European powers to mediate an end to the war. A joint ultimatum by the European powers forced the Porte to give Serbia a one-month truce and start peace negotiations. Turkish peace conditions however were refused by European powers as too harsh. In early October, after the truce expired, the Turkish army resumed its offensive and the Serbian position quickly became desperate. On 31 October, Russia issued an ultimatum requiring the Ottoman Empire to stop the hostilities and sign a new truce with Serbia within 48 hours. This was supported by the partial mobilization of the Russian army (up to 20 divisions). The Sultan accepted the conditions of the ultimatum.

To resolve the crisis, on 11 December 1876, the Constantinople Conference of the Great Powers was opened in Constantinople (to which the Turks were not invited). A compromise solution was negotiated, granting autonomy to Bulgaria, Bosnia and Herzegovina under the joint control of European powers. The Ottomans, however, refused to sacrifice their independence by allowing international representatives to oversee the institution of reforms and sought to discredit the conference by announcing on 23 December, the day the conference was closed, that a constitution was adopted that declared equal rights for religious minorities within the Empire. The Ottomans attempted to use this manoeuver to get their objections and amendments to the agreement heard. When they were rejected by the Great Powers, the Ottoman Empire announced its decision to disregard the results of the conference.

On 15 January 1877, Russia and Austria-Hungary signed a written agreement confirming the results of an earlier Reichstadt Agreement in July 1876. This assured Russia of the benevolent neutrality of Austria-Hungary in the impending war. These terms meant that in case of war Russia would do the fighting and Austria would derive most of the advantage. Russia therefore made a final effort for a peaceful settlement. After reaching an agreement with its main Balkan rival and with anti-Ottoman sympathies running high throughout Europe due to the Bulgarian atrocities and the rejection of the Constantinople agreements, Russia finally felt free to declare war.

Status of combatants

The Ottoman Army 
The Ottoman army at this time solely conscripted Muslims with non-Muslims paying a poll tax in lieu of service, the army itself was divided into 4 categories the Nizam (standing army) who served for 4 years (5 years for cavalry and engineers), then there was the Ithiat or the 1st reserve where a further 2 years was served, thirdly there was the Redif which took veterans of the Nizam and Ithiat categories and men who did not serve. The Redif itself was divided into 4 categories the first category consisted of veterans of the Nizam category who served in the 1st redif sub-category for 4 years before entering the 2nd redif sub-category, men who were not conscripted served in the 3rd sub-category of the Redfi for 4 years before entering the 4th sub-category of the redif, the redfi itself was grouped into battalions and classes with whole battalions taken out to serve as new units. The 4th category was the Moustafiz which contained all men that completed their service in the Redif they served in the Moustafiz for a further 6 years.

Sultan Abdulaziz had opened a military school during his reign to educate officers however the turnout of this academy was poor and only 1,600 of the 20,000 regular officers of the army were academy trained though the artillery saw the highest concentration of academy trained officers at 20% of the total, for the entire Ottoman army only 132 academy trained generals were available.

The Ottoman army was organised at the battalion level with a battalion nominally holding 800 men subdivided into companies of 100 men, for formations above the battalion level these were to be assembled ad-hoc this results in difficulty at estimating Ottoman troop strength throughout the war as many units were below strength before entering the war due to the many rebellions affecting the empire. However, the Ottoman army was well prepared for war as the Ottoman army had increasingly called up its reserves up to the 3rd sub-category of the Redif when Russian forces began gathering in Bessarabia.

The Ottoman army was also well-equipped with 75% of the army equipped with the Peabody-martini rifle accurate to 1,800 yards. The Ottoman support services were however less impressive with the army often forced to resort to foraging though Ottoman forces were equipped with entrenching tools which they used extensively at Plevna and they had sufficient ammunition for their repeating rifles. The Ottoman artillery were armed with Krupp guns.

The Ottoman army at the outbreak of war was divided into several groups. The largest was the 168,000 under the command of Abdul Kerim Pasha based out of Shumla, 140,000 was assigned to the general task of fighting threats in the European provinces of the Empire with 45,000 in various garrisons in Anatolia Europe and Crete with the Caucasus army containing 70,000 men, the total of men under arms amounted to 378,000 men.

The Russian Army 
The Russian army in the decade prior to the war underwent major modernisation spearheaded by the Minister of war Milyutin, this programme of reform gave Russia a large army that was capable of fighting a war against the Ottomans. All Russian men were to serve 6 years in the active army and 9 years in the reserves though through exemption the effective intake of conscription was only 48% in peacetime though this was still sufficient to meet the Russian need for manpower. The Active portion of the army was subdivided into 2 portions the local troops who were garrison soldiers in Europe, regular soldiers in Asia, stationary forces and gendarmes the other portion was the Field army. In addition to these forces there was the militia which contained all men exempted from conscripted and men under 40 who had completed their terms of service.

The Field Army was organised into 48 infantry divisions (3 of which were guard and 4 Grenadier). There were also 8 rifle brigades, 19 cavalry divisions, 35 horse gun batteries, 19 engineer battalions, 49 field gun brigades. The Russian divisions were organised into corps of 2 to 3 divisions, a corps excluding support and command staff would consist of 20,160 infantry, 2,048 cavalry, 96 field guns and 12 horse drawn guns (this is for a 2 division corps).

The Russian army in 1874 contained 754,265 men and by January 1, 1878 this had risen to over 1.5million men. The Russian army used 2 rifles the Krnka rifle which they possessed 800,000 of at the minimum and was accurate to only 600 yards (to the Turkish Peabody's 1,800) and the Berdan rifle which equipped the Line, Grenadier, Rifle and Guard formations and was accurate to 1,500 yards. However, the Russian army despite possessing breechloading rifles was still holding to the maxims of Suvorov which called for the usage of the bayonet as the principal weapon, Russian soldiers also lacked entrenching equipment to an adequate level. Russian artillery despite being breechloaded were nearing obsolescence

Course of the war

Opening manoeuvres

On 12 April 1877, Romania gave permission to the Russian troops to pass through its territory to attack the Turks.

On 24 April 1877 Russia declared war on the Ottomans, and its troops entered Romania through the newly built Eiffel Bridge near Ungheni, on the Prut river, resulting in Turkish bombardments of Romanian towns on the Danube.

On 10 May 1877, the Principality of Romania, which was under formal Turkish rule, declared its independence.

At the beginning of the war, the outcome was far from obvious. The Russians could send a larger army into the Balkans: about 300,000 troops were within reach. The Ottomans had about 200,000 troops on the Balkan peninsula, of which about 100,000 were assigned to fortified garrisons, leaving about 100,000 for the army of operation. The Ottomans had the advantage of being fortified, complete command of the Black Sea, and patrol boats along the Danube river. They also possessed superior arms, including new British and American-made rifles and German-made artillery.

In the event, however, the Ottomans usually resorted to passive defense, leaving the strategic initiative to the Russians, who, after making some mistakes, found a winning strategy for the war. The Ottoman military command in Constantinople made poor assumptions about Russian intentions. They decided that Russians would be too lazy to march along the Danube and cross it away from the delta, and would prefer the short way along the Black Sea coast. This would be ignoring the fact that the coast had the strongest, best supplied and garrisoned Turkish fortresses. There was only one well manned fortress along the inner part of the river Danube, Vidin. It was garrisoned only because the troops, led by Osman Pasha, had just taken part in defeating the Serbs in their recent war against the Ottoman Empire.

The Russian campaign was better planned, but it relied heavily on Turkish passivity. A crucial Russian mistake was sending too few troops initially; an expeditionary force of about 185,000 crossed the Danube in June, slightly fewer than the combined Turkish forces in the Balkans (about 200,000). After setbacks in July (at Pleven and Stara Zagora), the Russian military command realized it did not have the reserves to keep the offensive going and switched to a defensive posture. The Russians did not even have enough forces to blockade Pleven properly until late August, which effectively delayed the whole campaign for about two months.

Balkan theatre

At the start of the war, Russia and Romania destroyed all vessels along the Danube and mined the river, thus ensuring that Russian forces could cross the Danube at any point without resistance from the Ottoman Navy. The Ottoman command did not appreciate the significance of the Russians' actions. In June, a small Russian unit crossed the Danube close to the delta, at Galați, and marched towards Ruschuk (today Ruse). This made the Ottomans even more confident that the big Russian force would come right through the middle of the Ottoman stronghold.

On 25–26 May, a Romanian torpedo boat with a mixed Romanian-Russian crew attacked and sank an Ottoman monitor on the Danube. Under the direct command of Major-General Mikhail Ivanovich Dragomirov, on the night of 27/28 June 1877 (NS) the Russians constructed a pontoon bridge across the Danube at Svishtov. After a short battle in which the Russians suffered 812 killed and wounded, the Russians secured the opposing bank and drove off the Ottoman infantry brigade defending Svishtov. At this point the Russian force was divided into three parts: the Eastern Detachment under the command of Tsarevich Alexander Alexandrovich, the future Tsar Alexander III of Russia, assigned to capture the fortress of Ruschuk and cover the army's eastern flank; the Western Detachment, to capture the fortress of Nikopol, Bulgaria and cover the army's western flank; and the Advance Detachment under Count Joseph Vladimirovich Gourko, which was assigned to quickly move via Veliko Tarnovo and penetrate the Balkan Mountains, the most significant barrier between the Danube and Constantinople.

Responding to the Russian crossing of the Danube, the Ottoman high command in Constantinople ordered Osman Nuri Paşa to advance east from Vidin and occupy the fortress of Nikopol, just west of the Russian crossing. On his way to Nikopol, Osman Pasha learned that the Russians had already captured the fortress and so moved to the crossroads town of Plevna (now known as Pleven), which he occupied with a force of approximately 15,000 on 19 July (NS). The Russians, approximately 9,000 under the command of General Schilder-Schuldner, reached Plevna early in the morning. Thus began the Siege of Plevna.

Osman Pasha organized a defense and repelled two Russian attacks with colossal casualties on the Russian side. At that point, the sides were almost equal in numbers and the Russian army was very discouraged. A counter-attack might have allowed the Ottomans to control and destroy the Russians' bridge, but Osman Pasha did not leave the fortress because he had orders to stay fortified in Plevna.

Russia had no more troops to throw against Plevna, so the Russians besieged it, and subsequently asked the Romanians to cross the Danube and help them. On 9 August, Suleiman Pasha made an attempt to help Osman Pasha with 30,000 troops, but he was stopped by Bulgarians at the Battle of Shipka Pass. After three days of fighting, the volunteers were relieved by a Russian force led by General Radezky, and the Turkish forces withdrew. Soon afterwards, Romanian forces crossed the Danube and joined the siege. On 16 August, at Gorni-Studen, the armies around Plevna were placed under the command of the Romanian Prince Carol I, aided by the Russian general Pavel Dmitrievich Zotov and the Romanian general Alexandru Cernat.

The Turks maintained several fortresses around Pleven which the Russian and Romanian forces gradually reduced. The Romanian 4th Division led by General Gheorghe Manu took the Grivitsa redoubt after four bloody assaults and managed to keep it until the very end of the siege. The siege of Plevna (July–December 1877) turned to victory only after Russian and Romanian forces cut off all supply routes to the fortified Ottomans. With supplies running low, Osman Pasha made an attempt to break the Russian siege in the direction of Opanets. On 9 December, in the middle of the night the Ottomans threw bridges over the Vit River and crossed it, attacked on a  front and broke through the first line of Russian trenches. Here they fought hand to hand and bayonet to bayonet, with little advantage to either side. Outnumbering the Ottomans almost 5 to 1, the Russians drove the Ottomans back across the Vit. Osman Pasha was wounded in the leg by a stray bullet, which killed his horse beneath him. Making a brief stand, the Ottomans eventually found themselves driven back into the city, losing 5,000 men to the Russians' 2,000. The next day, Osman surrendered the city, the garrison, and his sword to the Romanian colonel, Mihail Cerchez. He was treated honorably, but his troops perished in the snow by the thousands as they straggled off into captivity.

At this point Serbia, having finally secured monetary aid from Russia, declared war on the Ottoman Empire again. This time there were far fewer Russian officers in the Serbian army but this was more than offset by the experience gained from the 1876–77 war. Under nominal command of prince Milan Obrenović (effective command was in hands of general Kosta Protić, the army chief of staff), the Serbian Army went on offensive in what is now eastern south Serbia. A planned offensive into the Ottoman Sanjak of Novi Pazar was called off due to strong diplomatic pressure from Austria-Hungary, which wanted to prevent Serbia and Montenegro from coming into contact, and which had designs to spread Austria-Hungary's influence through the area. The Ottomans, outnumbered unlike two years before, mostly confined themselves to passive defence of fortified positions. By the end of hostilities the Serbs had captured Ak-Palanka (today Bela Palanka), Pirot, Niš and Vranje.

Russians under Field Marshal Joseph Vladimirovich Gourko succeeded in capturing the passes at the Stara Planina mountain, which were crucial for maneuvering. Next, both sides fought a series of battles for Shipka Pass. Gourko made several attacks on the Pass and eventually secured it. Ottoman troops spent much effort to recapture this important route, to use it to reinforce Osman Pasha in Pleven, but failed. Eventually Gourko led a final offensive that crushed the Ottomans around Shipka Pass. The Ottoman offensive against Shipka Pass is considered one of the major mistakes of the war, as other passes were virtually unguarded. At this time a huge number of Ottoman troops stayed fortified along the Black Sea coast and engaged in very few operations.

A Russian army crossed the Stara Planina by a high snowy pass in winter, guided and helped by local Bulgarians, not expected by the Ottoman army, and defeated the Turks at the Battle of Tashkessen and took Sofia. The way was now open for a quick advance through Plovdiv and Edirne to Constantinople.

Besides the Romanian Army (which mobilized 130,000 men, losing 10,000 of them to this war), more than 12,000 volunteer Bulgarian troops (Opalchenie) from the local Bulgarian population as well as many hajduk detachments fought in the war on the side of the Russians.

Caucasian theatre

The Russian Caucasus Corps was stationed in Georgia and Armenia, composed of approximately 50,000 men and 202 guns under the overall command of Grand Duke Michael Nikolaevich, Governor General of the Caucasus. The Russian force stood opposed by an Ottoman Army of 100,000 men led by General Ahmed Muhtar Pasha. While the Russian army was better prepared for the fighting in the region, it lagged behind technologically in certain areas such as heavy artillery and was outgunned, for example, by the superior long-range Krupp artillery that Germany had supplied to the Ottomans.

The Caucasus Corps was led by a quartet of Armenian commanders: Generals Mikhail Loris-Melikov, Arshak Ter-Gukasov (Ter-Ghukasov/Ter-Ghukasyan), Ivan Lazarev and Beybut Shelkovnikov. Forces under Lieutenant-General Ter-Gukasov, stationed near Yerevan, commenced the first assault into Ottoman territory by capturing the town of Bayazid on 27 April 1877. Capitalizing on Ter-Gukasov's victory there, Russian forces advanced, taking the region of Ardahan on 17 May; Russian units also besieged the city of Kars in the final week of May, although Ottoman reinforcements lifted the siege and drove them back. Bolstered by reinforcements, in November 1877 General Lazarev launched a new attack on Kars, suppressing the southern forts leading to the city and capturing Kars itself on 18 November. On 19 February 1878, the strategic fortress town of Erzurum was taken by the Russians after a lengthy siege. Although they relinquished control of Erzerum to the Ottomans at the end the war, the Russians acquired the regions of Batum, Ardahan, Kars, Olti, and Sarikamish and reconstituted them into the Kars Oblast.

Kurdish uprising 
As the Russo-Turkish war came to a close, a Kurdish uprising began. It was led by two brothers, Husein and Osman Pasha. The rebellion held most of the region of Bohtan for 9 months. It was ended only through duplicity, after force of arms had failed. In Kars, Kurdish notables like Abdürrezzak Bedir Khan and a son of Sheikh Ubeydullah were supporters of the Russians.

Civilian government in Bulgaria during the war 

After Bulgarian territories were liberated by the Imperial Russian Army during the war, they were governed initially by a provisional Russian administration, which was established in April 1877. The Treaty of Berlin (1878) provided for the termination of this provisional Russian administration in May 1879, when the Principality of Bulgaria and Eastern Rumelia were established. The main objectives of the temporary Russian administration were to secure peace and order and to prepare for a revival of the Bulgarian state.

Aftermath

Intervention by the Great Powers

Under pressure from the British, Russia accepted the truce offered by the Ottoman Empire on 31 January 1878, but continued to move towards Constantinople.

The British sent a fleet of battleships to intimidate Russia from entering the city, and Russian forces stopped at San Stefano. Eventually Russia entered into a settlement under the Treaty of San Stefano on 3 March, by which the Ottoman Empire would recognize the independence of Romania, Serbia, and Montenegro, and the autonomy of Bulgaria.

Alarmed by the extension of Russian power into the Balkans, the Great Powers later forced modifications of the treaty in the Congress of Berlin. The main change here was that Bulgaria would be split, according to earlier agreements among the Great Powers that precluded the creation of a large new Slavic state: the northern and eastern parts to become principalities as before (Bulgaria and Eastern Rumelia), though with different governors; and the Macedonian region, originally part of Bulgaria under San Stefano, would return to direct Ottoman administration.

The  was a further continuation of negotiations between Russia and the Ottoman Empire. While reaffirming provisions of the Treaty of San Stefano which had not been modified by the Berlin Treaty, it set compensation terms owed by Ottoman Empire to Russia for losses sustained during the war. It contained terms to release prisoners of war and to grant amnesty to Ottoman subjects, as well as providing terms for the inhabitants nationality after the annexations. Article VII allowed subjects to opt within six months of the signing of the treaty to retain Ottoman subjecthood or become Russian subjects.

A surprising consequence came in Hungary (part of the Austro-Hungarian Empire). Despite memories of the terrible defeat at Mohács in 1526, elite Hungarian attitudes were becoming strongly anti-Russian. This led to active support for the Turks in the media, but only in a peaceful way, since the foreign policy of the Austro-Hungarian monarchy remained neutral.

Effects on Bulgaria's Jewish population
The Bulletins de l'Alliance Israélite Universelle reported that thousands of Bulgarian Jews found refuge at the Ottoman capital of Constantinople and reported that many Jewish communities had fled in their entirety with the retreating Turks as their protectors.

However, this is directly contradicted by census figures, which, instead of a decrease, indicate a substantial increase in Bulgaria's Jewish population before and after the war. While there were only 4,595 males or 9,190 male and female Jews in the five vilayets to form the future Principality of Bulgaria—Rusçuk, Vidin, Sofia, Tirnova and Varna—according to the pre-war Ottoman salname of 1875 (0.44% of the population), the 1880 Bulgarian census indicated a total of 14,342 Jews, who acccounted for 0.71% of the post-war Bulgarian population. Moreover, an increase by 5,152 people, or 56%, in less than five years, cannot be explained by natural increase alone and would rather indicate substantial net immigration rather than emigration of Jews from the Principality.

Internationalization of the Armenian Question

The conclusion of the Russo-Turkish war also led to the internationalization of the Armenian Question. Many Armenians in the eastern provinces (Turkish Armenia) of the Ottoman Empire greeted the advancing Russians as liberators. Violence and instability directed at Armenians during the war by Kurd and Circassian bands had left many Armenians looking toward the invading Russians as the ultimate guarantors of their security. Influential pro-Russian Armenian thinker Grigor Artsruni encouraged Armenians to migrate to Russia in order to form a more concentrated block. In January 1878, Armenian Patriarch of Constantinople Nerses II Varzhapetian approached the Russian leadership with the view of receiving assurances that the Russians would introduce provisions in the prospective peace treaty for self-administration in the Armenian provinces. Though not as explicit, Article 16 of the Treaty of San Stefano read:

Armenian Patriarch discouraged Armenian migration to Russia and encouraged Armenians to “remain faithful to the Sultan”.Patriarch held the belief that Armenian-inhabited areas could remain under Ottoman rule, but under Christian control, and that Muslims who were dissatisfied with how the Ottomans had been governing the provinces would tolerate life under Christian leadership. In attempting to persuade the British to drive a hard bargain with the Ottoman Empire, he asserted to British Ambassador Henry Layard that the “only thing … that could induce the Armenians to refrain from listening to the advice of Russia to emigrate, and to be content to remain under the rule of the Sultan, would be the appointment of an Armenian as Vali of Armenia”. Great Britain, however, took objection to Russia holding on to so much Ottoman territory and forced it to enter into new negotiations by convening the Congress of Berlin in June 1878. An Armenian delegation led by prelate Mkrtich Khrimian traveled to Berlin to present the case of the Armenians but, much to its chagrin, was left out of the negotiations. Article 16 was modified and watered down, and all mention of the Russian forces remaining in the provinces was removed. In the final text of the Treaty of Berlin, it was transformed into Article 61, which read:

As it turned out, the reforms were not forthcoming. Khrimian returned to Constantinople and delivered a famous speech in which he likened the peace conference to a big cauldron of Liberty Stew' into which the big nations dipped their 'iron ladles' for real results, while the Armenian delegation had only a 'Paper Ladle'. 'Ah dear Armenian people,' Khrimian said, 'could I have dipped my Paper Ladle in the cauldron it would sog and remain there! Where guns talk and sabers shine, what significance do appeals and petitions have? Given the absence of tangible improvements in the plight of the Armenian community, a number of Armenian intellectuals living in Europe and Russia in the 1880s and 1890s formed political parties and revolutionary societies to secure better conditions for their compatriots in Ottoman Armenia and other parts of the Ottoman Empire.

Civilian casualties

Atrocities and ethnic cleansing 
Both sides carried out massacres and an ethnic cleansing policy during the war.

Against Turks

In January 1878, advancing coalition forces started committing atrocities against Muslim populations in the region. British reports from that time have detailed information about atrocities and massacres. According to those reports, in the village of İssova Bâlâ, the school and 96 of the 170 houses were burned to the ground. The inhabitants of Yukarı Sofular were slaughtered and 12 of the 130 houses in village, a mosque, and a school were burned. In Kozluca, 18 Turks were killed. Massacres of Muslim inhabitants occurred in Kazanlak too. In the village of Muflis, 127 Muslim inhabitants were kidnapped by a group of Russian and Bulgarian troops. 20 managed to escape. The rest were killed. 400 people from Muflis were killed according to Ottoman sources. 11 inhabitants were killed in Keçidere. According to John Joseph the Russian troops frequently killed Muslim peasants to prevent them from disrupting their supply and troop movements. During the Battle of Harmanli accompanying this retaliation on Muslim non-combatants, it was reported that a huge group of Muslim townspeople were attacked by the Russian army. Thousands died and their goods were confiscated. The correspondent of the Daily News describes as an eyewitness the burning of four or five Turkish villages by the Russian troops in response to the Turks firing at the Russians from the villages, instead of behind rocks or trees, which must have appeared to the Russian soldiers as guerrilla attempts by the local Muslim populace upon the Russian contingencies operating against the Ottoman forces embedded in the area. During the conflict a number of Muslim buildings and cultural centres were also destroyed. A large library of old Turkish books was destroyed when a mosque in Turnovo was burned in 1877. Most mosques in Sofia were destroyed, seven of them in one night in December 1878 when "a thunderstorm masked the noise of the explosions arranged by Russian military engineers."

Many villages in the Kars region were pillaged by Russian army during the war. The war in Caucasus caused many Muslims to migrate to remaining Ottoman lands, mostly in poverty and with poor conditions. Between 1878 and 1881, 82,000 Muslims migrated to the Ottoman Empire from lands ceded to Russia in Caucasus.

Muslim war refugees according to census data and Ottoman official documents
According to Ottoman official records, the total number of refugees from the lands ceded in 1878 to the Principality of Bulgaria, Eastern Rumelia, Serbia, Romania and Austria-Hungary (from Bosnia) from 1876 to 1879 stands at 571,152 people: 276,389 in 1876, 198,000 in 1877, 76,000 in 1878 and 20,763 in 1879. However, it is unclear if the numbers include refugees who remigrated after the suspension of hostilities.

According to the pre-war Ottoman salname of 1875, the total male Muslim population of the five vilayets to form the future Principality of Bulgaria—Rusçuk, Vidin, Sofia, Tirnova and Varna—stood at 405,450 (total population of 810,900), however, inclusive of Circassian Muhacir and Muslim Romani. The Danube Vilayet census of 1874, which covered all sanjaks in the vilayet except Niš counted a total of 963,596 Muslims. The total Muslim population of the Danube Vilayet for the same year, Sanjak of Niš included, stood at 1,055,650. This number included not only Ottoman Turks, but also Crimean Tatars, Circassians, Pomaks, Romani as well as a substantial number of Albanians.

At the same time, the 1876 Ottoman population records for the Sanjaks of Filibe and İslimye, which were detached from the Adrianople Vilayet to form Eastern Rumelia in 1878, indicated 171,777 male Turks and 16,353 male Muslim Romani, or total Muslim population of 376,260. This figure however included the Rhodopian kazas of Ahi Çelebi and Sultanyeri (male Muslim population of 8,197 and 13,336, respectively, or total Muslim population for both of 43,066), which remained part of in the Ottoman Empire. Without Ahi Çelebi and Sultanyeri, the Muslim population of Eastern Rumelia was 333,194.

Thus, according to the Ottoman Empire's own population records, the total number of Muslims in the territories ceded by the Empire to the Principality of Bulgaria, Eastern Rumelia, Serbia and Romania, did not exceed 1,388,844 people (1,055,650 for the Danube Vilayet and 333,194 for the Filibe and İslimye Sanjaks), a figure that is lower than the approx. 1.5 million Turks who had reportedly perished or been forced to migrate according to both Karpat and İpek—whose estimates would also necessarily mean that no Muslims whatsoever remained in either the Principality of Bulgaria, Eastern Rumelia, Serbia or Romanian Dobruja.

At the same time, the 1880 population census of the Principality of Bulgaria gave 578,060 Muslims; the 1880 population census of Eastern Rumelia indicated 174,749 Turks and 19,254 Romani (total Muslim population of 194,003); the 1880 population census of Romanian North Dobruja showed 18,624 Turks and 29,476 Crimean Tatars (total of 48,100 Muslims), while the 1880 population census of Serbia stated only 6,567 Muslims in the Niš area.

Thus, as of 1880, the total number of Muslims who lived in the territories ceded by the Ottoman Empire  stood at 827,000 people, down from 1,388,844 Muslims counted by the pre-war Ottoman statistics, signifying a net loss of 561,844 Muslims (40.4%). While shockingly high, this figure falls short by more than 200,000 people of Dennis Hupchick and Justin McCarthy's estimates of some 260,000 Muslims missing/dead and 500,000 forced to emigrate and is way more off compared to the figure of more than 750,000 Muslim casualties and victims of ethnic cleansing from the Bulgarian lands alone quoted by Douglas Arthur Howard.

The Principality of Bulgaria, Eastern Rumelia and Romania accounted for a negative net balance of 472,792 Muslims (or a net loss of 36.5%).

By comparison, Serbia, the only country in the region, which did indeed engage in ethnic cleansing and forced expulsion of its Muslim population, effectively reduced its Muslim population between 1877 and 1880 from 95,619 to 6,567 people (cf. Expulsion of the Albanians, 1877–1878), i.e., a net loss of 89,052 Muslims, or 93%.

Historians' estimates about Muslim population losses
20th century historians have made different guesses about the total Muslim losses during the Russo-Turkish war. Dennis Hupchik and Justin McCarthy says that 260,000 people went missing and 500,000 became refugees. Turkish historian Kemal Karpat claims that 250–300,000 people, about 17% of the former Muslim population of Bulgaria, died as a consequence of famine, disease, and massacres, and 1 to 1.5 million people were forced to migrate. Turkish author Nedim İpek gives the same numbers as Karpat. Another source claims 400,000 Turks were massacred and 1,000,000 Turks had to migrate during the war. The perpetrators of those massacres are also disputed, with Justin McCarthy claiming that they were carried out by Russian soldiers, Cossacks as well as Bulgarian volunteers and villagers, though there were few civilian casualties in battle. while James J. Reid claims that Circassians were significantly responsible for the refugee flow, that there were civilian casualties from battle and even that the Ottoman army was responsible for casualties among the Muslim population. The number of Muslim refugees is estimated by R.J. Crampton to be 130,000. Richard C. Frucht estimates that only half (700,000) of the prewar Muslim population remained after the war, 216,000 had died and the rest emigrated. Douglas Arthur Howard estimates that half the 1.5 million Muslims, for the most part Turks, in prewar Bulgaria had disappeared by 1879. 200,000 had died, the rest became permanently refugees in Ottoman territories.

In this connection, it is important to note that Justin McCarthy, who is the author of the estimates above and has been requoted by both Hupchik and Howard, is an Armenian Genocide denialist who has been criticised severely by many of his colleagues for whitewashing Ottoman history. Moreover, McCarthy is a member of, and has received grants from, the Institute of Turkish Studies. Throughout his career, he has been accused, among other things, of being "an apologist for the Turkish state", of having "an indefensible bias toward the Turkish official position", of selectively using sources and of always ascribing intent to non-Ottoman troops while making excuses for Ottoman ones for similar events.

Against Albanians

Against Bulgarians

The most notable massacre of Bulgarian civilians took place after the July battle of Stara Zagora when Gurko's forces had to retreat back to the Shipka pass. In the aftermath of the battle Suleiman Pasha's forces burned down and plundered the town of Stara Zagora which by that time was one of the largest towns in the Bulgarian lands. The number of massacred Christian civilians during the battle is estimated at 15,000. Suleiman Pasha's forces also established in the whole valley of the Maritsa river a system of terror taking form in the hanging at the street corners of every Bulgarian who had in any way assisted the Russians, but even villages that had not assisted the Russians were destroyed and their inhabitants massacred. As a result, as many as 100,000 civilian Bulgarians fled north to the Russian occupied territories. Later on in the campaign the Ottoman forces planned to burn the town of Sofia after Gurko had managed to overcome their resistance in the passes of Western part of the Balkan Mountains. Only the refusal of the Italian Consul Vito Positano, the French Vice Consul Léandre François René le Gay and the Austro–Hungarian Vice Consul to leave Sofia prevented that from happening. After the Ottoman retreat, Positano even organized armed detachments to protect the population from marauders (regular Ottoman Army deserters and bashi-bazouks). Circassians in the Ottoman forces also raped and murdered Bulgarians during the 1877 Russo-Turkish war.

According to Bulgarian historians, 30,000 Bulgarian civilians were killed during the war, with two-thirds of the killings being committed in the Stara Zagora area.

Against Circassians
Russians raped Circassian girls during the 1877 Russo-Turkish war from the Circassian refugees who were settled in the Ottoman Balkans. After the signing of the Treaty of San Stefano, the 10,000-strong Circassian minority in Dobruja was expelled.

Lasting effects

International Red Cross and Red Crescent Movement

This war caused a division in the emblems of the International Red Cross and Red Crescent Movement which continues to this day. Both Russia and the Ottoman Empire had signed the First Geneva Convention (1864), which made the Red Cross, a colour reversal of the flag of neutral Switzerland, the sole emblem of protection for military medical personnel and facilities. However, during this war the cross instead reminded the Ottomans of the Crusades; so they elected to replace the cross with the Red Crescent instead. This ultimately became the symbol of the Movement's national societies in most Muslim countries, and was ratified as an emblem of protection by later Geneva Conventions in 1929 and again in 1949 (the current version).

Iran, which neighbored both the Russian Empire and Ottoman Empire, considered them to be rivals, and probably considered the Red Crescent in particular to be an Ottoman symbol; except for the Red Crescent being centred and without a star, it is a colour reversal of the Ottoman flag (and the modern Turkish flag). This appears to have led to their national society in the Movement being initially known as the Red Lion and Sun Society, using a red version of the Lion and Sun, a traditional Iranian symbol. After the Iranian Revolution of 1979, Iran switched to the Red Crescent, but the Geneva Conventions continue to recognize the Red Lion and Sun as an emblem of protection.

In popular culture

The novella Jalaleddin, published in 1878 by the novelist Raffi describes the Kurdish massacres of Armenians in the eastern Ottoman Empire at the time of the Russo-Turkish war. The novella follows the journey of a young man through the mountains of Anatolia. The historical descriptions in the novella correspond with information from British sources at the time.

The novel The Doll (Polish title: Lalka), written in 1887–1889 by Bolesław Prus, describes consequences of the Russo-Turkish war for merchants living in Russia and partitioned Poland. The main protagonist helped his Russian friend, a multi-millionaire, and made a fortune supplying the Russian Army in 1877–1878. The novel describes trading during political instability, and its ambiguous results for Russian and Polish societies.

The 1912 silent film Independența României depicted the war in Romania.

Russian writer Boris Akunin uses the war as the setting for the novel The Turkish Gambit (1998).

See also 
 Battles of the Russo-Turkish War (1877–78)
 Ottoman fleet organisation during the Russo-Turkish War (1877–78)
 Batak massacre
 Romanian War of Independence
 Harmanli massacre
 History of the Balkans
 Provisional Russian Administration in Bulgaria
 Monument to the Tsar Liberator
 The Turkish Gambit
 Serbo-Russian March

Notes

References

Bibliography
 .

Further reading
 
 Baleva, Martina. "The Empire Strikes Back. Image Battles and Image Frontlines during the Russo-Turkish War of 1877–1878." Ethnologia Balkanica 16 (2012): 273–294. online
 Dennis, Brad. "Patterns of Conflict and Violence in Eastern Anatolia Leading Up to the Russo-Turkish War and the Treaty of Berlin." War and Diplomacy: The Russo-Turkish War of 1878 (1877): 273–301.
 Drury, Ian. The Russo-Turkish War 1877 (Bloomsbury Publishing, 2012).
 .
 Isci, Onur. "Russian and Ottoman Newspapers in the War of 1877–1878." Russian History 41.2 (2014): 181–196. online
 Murray, Nicholas. The Rocky Road to the Great War: The Evolution of Trench Warfare to 1914. Potomac Books Inc. (an imprint of the University of Nebraska Press), 2013.
 Neuburger, Mary. "The Russo‐Turkish war and the ‘Eastern Jewish question’: Encounters between victims and victors in Ottoman Bulgaria, 1877–8." East European Jewish Affairs 26.2 (1996): 53–66.
 Stone, James. "Reports from the Theatre of War. Major Viktor von Lignitz and the Russo-Turkish War, 1877–78." Militärgeschichtliche Zeitschrift 71.2 (2012): 287–307. online contains primary sources
 Todorov, Nikolai. "The Russo-Turkish War of 1877–1878 and the Liberation of Bulgaria: An Interpretative Essay." East European Quarterly 14.1 (1980): 9+ online
 Yavuz, M. Hakan, and Peter Sluglett, eds. War and diplomacy: the Russo-Turkish war of 1877–1878 and the treaty of Berlin (U of Utah Press, 2011) 
 Yildiz, Gültekin. "Russo-Ottoman War, 1877–1878." in Richard C. Hall, ed., War in the Balkans (2014): 256–258 online.

External links

 .
 .
 .
 .
 .
 
 Russo-Turkish War (1877–1878). Historical photos.

Video links 
130 years Liberation of Pleven (Plevna)
 .
 .
 .

 
Conflicts in 1877
Conflicts in 1878
Modern history of Bulgaria
Wars involving Chechnya
Wars involving Romania
Wars involving Serbia
Wars involving Montenegro
Wars involving Bulgaria
Russo-Turkish wars
1877 in Bulgaria
1878 in Bulgaria
1870s in the Ottoman Empire
Modern history of Armenia
Modern history of Georgia (country)
Alexander II of Russia